Mount Wells is a locality and land feature located in bushland near Boddington, south-east of Perth. It is located on the Bibbulmun Track and is also known as Wourahming Hill.

History
Mount Wells's history since colonisation, as the highest point in the area, was as a fire lookout for the surrounding timber milling region. The original fire tower and huts were ironically destroyed by fire in 1961, but rebuilt in 1962. It was renovated by the Department of Conservation and Land Management (CALM) and a Karnet Prison crew in 1997 for overnight use by walkers on the 'new' Bibbulmun Track, Western Australia's award-winning walk trail, stretching nearly 1,000 kilometres from the Perth Hills to Albany.

Present day
A sleeping shelter for 8-10 people has been constructed from an old firetower-keeper's hut, complete with old wood stove, for overnight use by walkers on the Bibbulmun Track. The nearby tower is still occasionally used as a fire lookout and offers views of the Darling Scarp as well as nearby gold mining operations. A 14 km return walk to Boonering Hill, a giant granite mount rising above the jarrah forest north of Mount Wells, is popular among bushwalkers, with verticordia flowers covering its fringes in spring.

Boddington Gold Mine
The nearby Boddington Gold Mine, south-east of the locality and presently owned by Newmont Mining (67%) and AngloGold (33%), commenced operations in 1987. It ceased mining operations on 30 November 2001 after all known economic gold oxide resources had been processed, and is currently in a "care and maintenance" phase. A bedrock resource (19.57 MOz) has been identified, and expansion of the facility to allow mining and processing of basement rock was approved in 2002. Construction began in May 2006.

References

External links
 Bibbulmun Track homepage
 Boddington Gold Mine homepage

Towns in Western Australia
Shire of Boddington